A mosquito coil is a mosquito-repelling incense, usually made into a spiral, and typically made using dried paste of pyrethrum powder. The coil is usually held at the center of the spiral, suspending it in the air, or wedged by two pieces of fireproof netting to allow continuous smoldering. Burning usually begins at the outer end of the spiral and progresses slowly toward the center of the spiral, producing a mosquito-repellent smoke. Mosquito coils are widely used in Asia, Africa, South America, Canada, Mexico and Australia.

Invention
Pyrethrum was used for centuries as an insecticide in Persia and Europe, being developed into a mosquito coil in the late 1800s by a Japanese couple: Yuki and Eiichiro Ueyama (上山英一郎). At that time in Japan, pyrethrum powder was mixed with sawdust and burned to repel mosquitoes. Ueyama initially created incense sticks mixed from starch powder, dried mandarin orange skin powder, and pyrethrum powder, burning in around 40 minutes. In 1895, Yuki proposed making the sticks thicker and longer, and curling them in spirals, in order to make them last longer. In 1902, after a series of trials and errors, Eiichiro achieved an incense burning effect with a spiral shape. The method included cutting thick incense bars to a set length and manually winding them into a spiral. This method was used until 1957, when mass production was made possible through machine punching. After the Second World War, his company, Dainihon Jochugiku Co. Ltd, established joint-venture firms in various countries, including China and Thailand, to produce mosquito-repelling products based on local conditions.

Ingredients
Active ingredients found in mosquito coils may include:

 Pyrethrum: a natural, powdered material from a kind of chrysanthemum plant.
 Pyrethrins: an extract of the insecticidal chemicals in pyrethrum.
 Allethrin: sometimes d-trans-allethrin, the first synthetic pyrethroid.
 Esbiothrin: a form of allethrin.
 Dimefluthrin: a novel fluorinated pyrethroid pesticide.
 Meperfluthrin: a fluorinated pyrethroid ester
 Metofluthrin: a fluorinated pyrethroid insecticide which is highly effective against mosquitoes. Also used in most mosquito repellants like candles, patches and mini fans.
 Butylated hydroxytoluene (BHT): an optional additive used to prevent pyrethroid from oxidizing during burning.
 Piperonyl butoxide (PBO): an optional additive to improve the effectiveness of pyrethroid.
 N-Octyl bicycloheptene dicarboximide (MGK 264): an optional additive to improve the effectiveness of a pyrethroid.

Disadvantages
Mosquito coils can be fire hazards. Their use has resulted in numerous accidental fires. In 1999, a fire in a South Korean three-story dormitory caused the death of 23 people when a mosquito coil was left unattended.

The strong smell from the smoke may also linger, permeating fabric and furniture.

Mosquito coils are considered to be safe insecticides for humans and mammals, although some studies highlight concerns when they are used in closed rooms. Coils sold in China and Malaysia were found to produce as much smoke PM2.5 as 75–137 burning cigarettes and formaldehyde emission levels in line with 51 burning cigarettes. Other studies in rats conclude that mosquito coils are not a significant health risk, although some organisms may experience temporary sensory irritation like that caused by smoke from the combustion of organic materials such as logs. In one study, rats were directly exposed to a coil's smoke for six hours a day, five days a week for thirteen weeks. They showed signs of sensory irritation from the high smoke concentration, but there were no adverse effects on other parts of the body. The study concluded that, with normal use, mosquito coils are unlikely to be a health risk.

See also
Mosquito trap

References

External links

 History of Dainihon Jochugiku Co. Ltd

Incense
Insect repellents
Insecticides
Japanese inventions